Juan José Lopez-Ibor (Sollana, Valencia, 22 April 1906Madrid 1991) was a Spanish psychiatrist.

He studied medicine at the University of Valencia and of Madrid, where he obtained his doctorate in 1930.  In 1932, he was awarded the chair of Legal Medicine in Santiago de Compostela; later, the chair of Psychiatry in Salamanca, In 1960, he succeeded Antonio Vallejo Nájera at the Chair of Psychiatry in Madrid. In  1940, he founded Actas Españolas de Psiquiatría. From a very young age he was considered opposed to the Freudian method of psychoanalysis. In 1967 he created the López Ibor Clinic in Madrid.

From 1966 to 1971, Juan José Lopez-Ibor was president of the World Psychiatric Association.

He is the father of Juan José López-Ibor Aliño, and grandfather of María Inés López-Ibor Alcocer. He died of Alzheimer's disease.

Work
Neurosis de guerra (1939)
Epilepsia genuina (1941)
La angustia vital (1950)
El descubrimiento de la intimidad (1952)
El español y su complejo de inferioridad (1953)
Lecciones de Psicología médica (vol. I, 1957; vol. II, 1961)
Libro de la vida sexual (1968)
De la noche oscura a la angustia (1973)
Cómo se fabrica una bruja (1976)

References

Spanish psychiatrists
1906 births
1991 deaths
Complutense University of Madrid alumni